Bridgewater is a town in Grafton County, New Hampshire, United States. The population was 1,160 at the 2020 census.

History 
The land comprising Bridgewater was originally part of a town known as "New Chester", which was separated into Bridgewater, Bristol, Hill, Danbury, and Wilmot. The town name was chosen because many of the settlers were from Bridgewater, Massachusetts.

Bridgewater originally included all of Bridgewater, Hill and Bristol. It was first settled in 1776, by Thomas Crawford. It was incorporated 12 February 1788.

In 1874, the Bridgewater station was served by the Montreal railroad.

Geography 
Bridgewater lies fully within the Merrimack River watershed. The western town line follows the eastern shore of Newfound Lake.

Demographics 

At the 2000 census there were 974 people, 414 households, and 289 families living in the town.  The population density was 45.8 people per square mile (17.7/km).  There were 850 housing units at an average density of 40.0 per square mile (15.4/km).  The racial makeup of the town was 99.08% White, 0.10% Native American, 0.51% Asian, 0.21% from other races, and 0.10% from two or more races. Hispanic or Latino of any race were 0.62%.

Of the 414 households 24.9% had children under the age of 18 living with them, 61.6% were married couples living together, 6.5% had a female householder with no husband present, and 30.0% were non-families. 23.9% of households were one person and 12.3% were one person aged 65 or older.  The average household size was 2.35 and the average family size was 2.78.

The age distribution was 19.7% under the age of 18, 4.5% from 18 to 24, 25.2% from 25 to 44, 31.3% from 45 to 64, and 19.3% 65 or older.  The median age was 45 years. For every 100 females, there were 96.8 males.  For every 100 females age 18 and over, there were 89.8 males.

The median household income was $50,662 and the median family income  was $54,722. Males had a median income of $33,250 versus $26,250 for females. The per capita income for the town was $28,600.  About 6.1% of families and 6.9% of the population were below the poverty line, including 5.4% of those under age 18 and 4.9% of those age 65 or over.

Education
It is within the Newfound Area School District. Bridgewater-Hebron Village School is in Bridgewater. The district's secondary schools are Newfound Memorial Middle School, and Newfound Regional High School in Bristol.

References

External links
 
 New Hampshire Economic and Labor Market Information Bureau Profile

Towns in Grafton County, New Hampshire
Towns in New Hampshire